The College of Education, Waka-Biu is a state government higher education institution located in Biu, Borno State, Nigeria. The current Provost is Mohammed Alhaji Audu.

History 
The College of Education, Waka-Biu was established in 1986. It was formally known as Advanced Teachers' College, Waka-Biu.

Courses 
The insti tution offers the following courses;

 Computer Education
 Economics Education
 Integrated Science Education
 Education and Hausa
 Geography
 Christian Religious Studies
 Education and Chemistry
 Home Economics
 Education and Geography
 Education and Physics
 Education and Biology
 Islamic Studies
 English Education
 Agricultural Science Education
 Arabic
 Mathematics Education
 Biology Education
 Physical And Health Education
 Health Education
 Hausa
 Chemistry Education

References 

Universities and colleges in Nigeria
1986 establishments in Nigeria
Education in Borno State